Niclas Fiedler (born 7 March 1998) is a German footballer who plays as a left back for Einheit Rudolstadt.

References

External links
 Profile at kicker.de
 Profile at FuPa.net
 

1998 births
Living people
Sportspeople from Gera
Footballers from Thuringia
German footballers
Association football defenders
FC Schalke 04 II players
Hallescher FC players
FC Carl Zeiss Jena players
FC Einheit Rudolstadt players
3. Liga players
Oberliga (football) players